Dingevatn or Dingevatnet is the 18th deepest lake in Norway, reaching a maximum depth of . It is located in the municipality of Gulen in Vestland county. The lake flows out into the small Dingjaelva river, which runs past the village of Dingja before emptying into the Sognesjøen strait.

See also
List of lakes in Norway

References

Lakes of Vestland
Gulen